Melbourne City Football Club, an association football club based in Cranbourne East, Melbourne, was founded in 2009 as Melbourne Heart. They became the second Victorian member admitted into the A-League Men in 2010 after their local rivals Melbourne Victory.

Scott Jamieson holds the record for the greatest number of appearances for Melbourne City playing. Between 2017 and 2021 the Australian defender played 154 times for the club. The club's goalscoring record is held by Jamie Maclaren, who has scored 95 goals in all competitions between 2019 and the present day. He surpassed the previous record of 57 goals, held by Bruno Fornaroli in 2021.

Key
 The list is ordered first by date of debut, and then if necessary in alphabetical order.
 Appearances as a substitute are included.
 Statistics are correct up to and including the match played on 19 March 2023. Where a player left the club permanently after this date, his statistics are updated to his date of leaving.

Players

Captains
Seven players have captained Melbourne City since it was founded as Melbourne Heart in 2009, first being Simon Colosimo, who captained the team until the end of their inaugural season in 2011. The club's longest-serving captain is Scott Jamieson, who has currently captained the club for four years between 2018 and 2022.

References
General
 
 

Specific

Players
Lists of soccer players by club in Australia
Melbourne sport-related lists
Association football player non-biographical articles